East Vindex is an unincorporated community in Garrett County, Maryland, United States. The town is located near the Maryland/West Virginia border. There is also a West Vindex.

References

Unincorporated communities in Garrett County, Maryland
Unincorporated communities in Maryland